is one of ten wards of the city of Saitama, in Saitama Prefecture, Japan, and is located in the southwestern part of the city. , the ward had an estimated population of 95,829 and a population density of 5,100 persons per km².

Geography
Sakura Ward is located in the far southwestern corner of Saitama City on the floodplain of the Arakawa River and the Kamo River.

Neighboring Municipalities
Saitama Prefecture
Nishi-ku
Ōmiya-ku
Chūō-ku
Minami-ku
Asaka
Shiki
Fujimi

History
The area of modern Sakura Ward has been inhabited since prehistoric times, and there are many kofun burial mounds in the area.
The villages of Okubo and Tsuchiai and Miyamoto were created within Kitaadachi District, Saitama with the establishment of the municipalities system on April 1, 1889. On January 1, 1955 these villages were annexed by Urawa City. On May 1, 2001 the cities of Urawa, Yono and Ōmiya merged to form the new city of Saitama.  When Saitama was proclaimed a designated city in 2003, the area corresponding to former Okubo and most of former became Sakura Ward. The name of Sakura-ku means "Cherry-ward" literally, though it refers to Sakura-sō (Japanese primrose), as this area has been well known for wild primrose flowers.

Education
Saitama University
 Sakura-ku has eight elementary schools, four junior high schools, and three high schools and one special education school.

Public junior high schools:

 Kami Okubo (上大久保中学校)
 Okubo (大久保中学校)
 Tajima (田島中学校)
 Tsuchiai (土合中学校)

Municipal elementary schools:

 Jinde (神田小学校)
 Nakajima (中島小学校)
 Okubo (大久保小学校)
 Okubo Higashi (大久保東小学校)
 Sakawa (栄和小学校)
 Shibiraki (新開小学校)
 Tajima (田島小学校)
 Tsuchiai (土合小学校)

Transportation

Railway
 JR East – Musashino Line

Highway
   Shuto Expressway Ōmiya Route

Local attractions
Akigase Park

References

External links

 

Wards of Saitama (city)